The olive-breasted greenbul (Arizelocichla kikuyuensis) is a species of the bulbul family of passerine birds. It is found in eastern Democratic Republic of Congo, south-western and south-eastern Uganda, Rwanda, Burundi, and central Kenya.

Taxonomy and systematics
The olive-breasted greenbul was originally described in the genus Xenocichla (a synonym for Bleda), then classified in Andropadus and, in 2010 re-classified to the new genus Arizelocichla. Also, some authorities consider the olive-breasted greenbul to be a subspecies of western greenbul or the mountain greenbul. Alternate names for the olive-breasted greenbul include the Kikuyu grey-throated greenbul and western mountain greenbul. The alternate name 'western mountain greenbul' is also used by the western greenbul.

References

olive-breasted greenbul
Birds of Sub-Saharan Africa
Birds of East Africa
olive-breasted greenbul